"Beautiful Me" is the first single by British hip hop artist Dappy, off of his album Miracles. The song was produced by Mac & Phil and Nathan Retro and was written by Dappy. It is due for release on 29 March 2015.

The record captures all aspects of Dappy’s troubled life over the past few years. The video documents his financial woes, legal battles and affairs of the heart.  The music video was premiered on the 28 January.

References

Dappy songs
2015 songs
Songs written by Dappy
All Around the World Productions singles
Song recordings produced by Nathan Retro